Rambo III is a 1988 American action film directed by Peter MacDonald and co-written by Sylvester Stallone, who also reprises his role as Vietnam War veteran John Rambo. A sequel to Rambo: First Blood Part II (1985), it is the third installment in the Rambo franchise.

The film depicts fictional events during the Soviet–Afghan War. In the film, Rambo sets out on a dangerous journey to Afghanistan in order to rescue his former commander and his longtime best friend, Col. Sam Trautman, from the hands of an extremely powerful and ruthless Soviet Army colonel who is bent on killing both Trautman and Rambo, while helping a local band of Afghan rebels fight against Soviet forces threatening to destroy their village.

Rambo III was released worldwide on May 25, 1988. At the time of its release, Rambo III was the most expensive film ever made with a production budget between $58 and $63 million. The film was not well received by critics and grossed less than its predecessor, Rambo: First Blood Part II, earning $189 million worldwide.

A sequel, Rambo, was released in 2008 with Stallone reprising his role and also directing the film.

Plot

John Rambo settles in a Thai monastery and helps with construction work on the monastery grounds. He supports the monastery by competing in krabi-krabong matches in nearby Bangkok. His old friend and ally Colonel Sam Trautman visits, and explains that he is putting together a mercenary team for a CIA-sponsored mission to supply the Mujahideen and other tribes as they try to repel the Soviet Army in Afghanistan. Despite being shown photos of civilians suffering at the hands of the Soviet military, Rambo refuses to join, as he is tired of fighting. Trautman proceeds anyway and is ambushed by enemy forces near the border, resulting in all of his men being killed. Trautman is captured and sent to a large mountain base to be interrogated by Soviet Colonel Zaysen and his henchman Sergeant Kourov.

Embassy official Robert Griggs informs Rambo of Col. Trautman's capture but refuses to approve a rescue mission for fear of drawing the United States into the war. Aware that Trautman will die otherwise, Rambo gets permission to undertake a solo rescue on the condition that he will be disavowed in the event of capture or death. Rambo flies to Peshawar, Pakistan, where he intends to convince local arms dealer Mousa Ghani to bring him to Khost, the town closest to the Soviet base where Trautman is held captive.

The Mujahideen in the village, led by chieftain Masoud, hesitate to help Rambo free Trautman. Meanwhile, a Soviet informant in Ghani's employ informs the Soviets, who send two attack helicopters to destroy the village. Though Rambo destroys one of them with a DShK heavy machine gun, the rebels refuse to aid him any further. Aided only by Mousa and a young boy named Hamid, Rambo attacks the base and inflicts significant damage before being forced to retreat. Hamid, as well as Rambo, is wounded during the battle and Rambo sends him and Mousa away before resuming his infiltration.

Evading base security, Rambo reaches and frees Trautman just as he is about to be tortured with a flamethrower. He and Trautman rescue several other prisoners and hijack a Hind helicopter gunship to escape the base. The helicopter is damaged during takeoff and crashes, forcing the escapees to flee across the sand on foot. An attack helicopter pursues Rambo and Trautman to a nearby cave, where Rambo destroys it with an explosive arrow. A furious Zaysen sends Spetsnaz commandos under Kourov to kill them, but they are routed and killed. An injured Kourov attacks Rambo with his bare hands, but is overcome and killed.

As Rambo and Trautman make their way to the Pakistani border, Zaysen and his forces surround them. Masoud's Mujahideen forces attack the Soviets in a surprise cavalry charge. Rambo takes control of a tank and attacks Zaysen's Hind gunship in a head-on battle with both vehicles firing high-calibre machine gun rounds, Rambo firing the tank's main gun and Zaysen unleashing volleys of the Hind's high explosive rockets and missiles. The final charge sees the two vehicles collide, but Rambo survives after firing the tank's main gun. After the battle, Rambo and Trautman say goodbye to the Mujahideen and leave Afghanistan to go home.

Cast

 Sylvester Stallone as John J. Rambo
 Richard Crenna as U.S. Colonel Samuel R. "Sam" Trautman
 Kurtwood Smith as Robert Griggs
 Marc de Jonge as Soviet Colonel Alexei Zaysen
 Sasson Gabai as Afghan Mujahideen Mousa Ghani
 Doudi Shoua as Hamid
 Spiros Fokas as Afghan Mujahideen's leader Masoud
 Randy Raney as Soviet Sergeant Kourov
 Marcus Gilbert as Tomask
 Alon Abutbul as Nissem
 Masoud Assadollahi as Rahim
 Yosef Shiloach as Khalid
 Shaby Ben-Aroya as Soviet defector Yuri

Production

Development and writing
Sylvester Stallone later said his original premise of the film "was more in keeping with the theme of Tears of the Sun, but set in Afghanistan."

Bullitt and Red Heat scribe Harry Kleiner was hired to write a draft, but his script was rejected by Stallone.
 
Several weeks into filming, many of the film's crew were fired including the director of photography and director Russell Mulcahy. Stallone said:

The canvas of this movie is so large you have to constantly think 10 scenes ahead. You can't wing it. They didn't go into the Battle of Waterloo not knowing what their strategy would be. Well, this movie is kind of like a cinematic warfare. We have a huge cast and crew (more than 250 people) and tough locations to deal with. Everyone and everything has to coordinate.

Pre-production
In a 2008 online Q&A, Stallone stated that a disagreement over casting led to him firing Russell Mulcahy as the director:
He went to Israel two weeks before me with the task of casting two dozen vicious looking Russian troops. When I arrived on the set, what I saw was two dozen blond, blue-eyed pretty boys that resembled rejects from a surfing contest. Needless to say Rambo is not afraid of a little competition but being attacked by third rate male models could be an enemy that could overwhelm him. I explained my disappointment to Russell and he totally disagreed, so I asked him and his chiffon army to move on.

Mulcahy was replaced by Peter MacDonald, a veteran second unit director. It was MacDonald's first film as director but he was very experienced and had directed the second unit action sequences in Rambo: First Blood Part II. MacDonald later said, "I tried very hard to change the Rambo character a bit and make him a vulnerable and humorous person, I failed totally." "I knew instinctively what was a good and bad shot," he added. "Stallone knew his character because it was his third outing as Rambo. I wasn't shooting Shakespeare and at times it was hard to take it seriously." MacDonald shot the stick fighting sequence in Bangkok himself using a handheld camera.

The character Masoud, played by Greek actor Spiros Focás, was named after Mujahideen commander Ahmad Shah Massoud who fought the Soviets and later the Taliban.

Filming
The film was shot in Israel, Thailand, and Arizona. MacDonald:

There were so many restrictions in Israel, where you could and couldn't shoot. The producers and Stallone decided they would go back to Arizona where they had looked long before I was on the film. There was a group there called the re-enactors. We had around two hundred and fifty of these guys who re-enact the American Civil War. They were called on to do fight sequences, which they loved.

Equipment
The Mi-24 Hind-D helicopters seen in the film are modified Aérospatiale SA 330 Puma transport helicopters with fabricated bolt-on wings similar to the real Hind-Ds which were mainly used in the former Eastern Bloc. The other helicopter depicted is a slightly reshaped Aerospatiale Gazelle.

Dedication
The film ends with the on-screen caption, "This film is dedicated to the gallant people of Afghanistan." At some point after the September 11 attacks, an urban legend began that the dedication had actually read "... to the brave Mujahideen fighters" when the film was released in theaters, but then changed to "the gallant people of Afghanistan" after the 2001 attacks, since the Mujahideen were now associated to some extent with the Taliban. This urban legend has been repeated by some scholars. However, this is untrue, and some reviews of the film upon its release even mentioned the "gallant people of Afghanistan" dedication.

Music

An extensive film score was written by Oscar-winning American composer Jerry Goldsmith, conducting the Hungarian State Opera Orchestra; however, much of it was not used. Instead, much of the music Goldsmith penned for the previous installment was recycled. The original album, released by Scotti Bros., contained only a portion of the new music as well as three songs, only one of which was used in the film (Bill Medley's version of "He Ain't Heavy, He's My Brother", played over the end credits).

 It Is Our Destiny – Bill Medley (4:30)
 Preparations (4:58)
 Afghanistan (2:35)
 The Game (2:23)
 Another Time (3:54)
 He Ain't Heavy, He's My Brother – Bill Medley (4:30)
 Aftermath (2:42)
 Questions (3:34)
 The Bridge - Giorgio Moroder featuring Joe Pizullo (3:59)
 Final Battle (4:47)

A more complete 75-minute version of the score was later released by Intrada.
 Another Time (3:58)
 Preparations (06:21)
 The Money (0:52)
 I'm Used To It (1:00)
 Peshawar (1:12)
 Afghanistan (2:38)
 Questions (3:37)
 Then I'll Die (3:34)
 The Game (2:25)
 Flaming Village (4:07)
 The Aftermath (2:44)
 Night Entry (3:58)
 Under And Over (2:55)
 Night Fight (6:50)
 First Aid (2:46)
 The Long Climb (3:25)
 Going Down (1:52)
 The Cave (3:31)
 The Boot (1:53)
 You Did It, John (1:08)
 The Showdown (1:26)
 Final Battle (4:50)
 I'll Stay (9:00)

Release

Cut version
Potentially owing to the proximity of its release to the Hungerford massacre, one minute and five seconds of footage was removed from the film before it could be granted an 18 certificate by the British Board of Film Classification; the amount of deletions was then nearly tripled for its initial video release. Almost all of this footage was restored to the film upon video submission in 2000, aside from a compulsory cut for animal cruelty.

Home media
Rambo III was released on DVD on November 23, 2004, and a Blu-Ray release followed on May 23, 2008. Rambo III was released on 4K UHD Blu-Ray on November 13, 2018.

Reception

Box office
Rambo III opened in the United States on May 25, 1988, at 2,562 theaters in its opening weekend (the four-day Memorial Day weekend), ranking #2 behind Crocodile Dundee II. Overall, the film grossed $53,715,611 domestically and then took $135,300,000 overseas, giving Rambo III a box office total of $189,015,611. The film underperformed at the box-office. Some critics noted that the timing of the movie, with its unabashedly anti-Soviet tone, ran afoul of the opening of communism to the West under Mikhail Gorbachev, which had already changed the image of the Soviet Union to a substantial degree by the time the movie was finished.

Audiences polled by CinemaScore gave the film an average grade of "B+" on an A+ to F scale.

Critical response
The film scored a 41% on Rotten Tomatoes, based on 37 reviews and with an average rating of 4.70/10. The site's critical consensus states that "Rambo III finds its justice-dispensing hero far from the thoughtful drama that marked the franchise's beginning -- and just as far from quality action thriller entertainment." Metacritic gives the film a rating of 36 out of 100 based on 15 critic reviews, indicating "generally unfavorable reviews".

On At the Movies, prominent critics Gene Siskel and Roger Ebert agreed that Rambo III delivers all the mechanical elements that audiences expect from a big budget action movie but lacks the heart seen in similar films such as the James Bond series and even its immediate predecessor, Rambo: First Blood Part II. Siskel gave it a "thumbs up", while Ebert said he was undecided; however, at the end of the show Ebert's vote was logged as a "thumbs down".

Janet Maslin, reviewing the film in The New York Times, described Rambo III as a modernization of the western film and said that "modern special-effects technology, a huge budget and Mr. Stallone's own derring-do have conspired to let the film pack a wallop that no traditional western or war film could match." She criticized the political themes as one-dimensional, but applauded the film's sense of fun and willingness to engage in self-deprecating humor, though she noted that there are also many unintentionally humorous lines.

In West Germany, the Deutsche Film- und Medienbewertung (FBW), a government film rating office whose ratings influence financial support to filmmakers, earned criticism after it awarded a "worthwhile" rating (in German: wertvoll) to Rambo III.

Accolades

Other media

Sequel

A sequel titled Rambo was released in 2008.

Novelization
David Morrell, author of First Blood, the novel the first Rambo film is based on, wrote a novelization called Rambo III.

Comic books
A comic book adaptation of the film was published by Blackthorne Publishing.  Blackthorne also published a 3D version of its Rambo III comic.

Video games
Various companies released video games based on the film, including Ocean Software and Taito. In 1990, Sega released its own game based on the film for the Master System and Genesis/Mega Drive. Sega later adapted some of the battle scenes in the film for the 2008 arcade game Rambo. In 2014, the film was incorporated into Rambo: The Video Game, based on the first three Rambo films.

In popular culture
 In the film The Texas Chainsaw Massacre 2, the character of Chop Top jokes that the recording of one chainsaw murder sounds like "the Rambo III soundtrack", although at that time, there had only been two Rambo films.
 In the film Twins, Arnold Schwarzenegger's character looks at a poster of Rambo III featuring Stallone. He compares his biceps to Stallone's, but waves it off with a smile while shaking his head and walks away.
 The film Gremlins 2: The New Batch features parodies of Rambo: First Blood Part II and Rambo III.
 The film Hot Shots! Part Deux, is a parody of Rambo III. It involves the protagonist Topper Harley rescuing his mentor, Col. Denton Walters (played by Richard Crenna, parodying his character from the Rambo franchise).
 In the film MacGruber, the titular character has retired and lives as a monk in a small Ecuadorian village, before his mentor Col. Jim Faith arrives to ask his help for the retrieving a stolen nuclear warhead.

References

External links

 
 
 
 
 

1988 films
1988 action films
1980s adventure films
1980s war films
American action films
American anti-communist propaganda films
American sequel films
Carolco Pictures films
Cold War films
1980s English-language films
Films about terrorism in Asia
Films adapted into comics
Films directed by Peter MacDonald
Films scored by Jerry Goldsmith
Films set in Afghanistan
Films set in Pakistan
Films set in Thailand
Films shot in Arizona
Films shot in California
Films shot in Israel
Films shot in Pakistan
TriStar Pictures films
Golden Raspberry Award winning films
Films shot in Thailand
Rambo (franchise)
Films with screenplays by Sylvester Stallone
Soviet–Afghan War films
Films about United States Army Special Forces
1988 directorial debut films
Films produced by Buzz Feitshans
1980s American films